Meyssiez (before 2013: Meyssies) is a commune in the Isère department in southeastern France.

Its official name was changed from Meyssies to Meyssiez 8 November 2013.

Population

See also
Communes of the Isère department

References

Communes of Isère
Isère communes articles needing translation from French Wikipedia